Heybridge  may refer to:
 Heybridge, Brentwood, Essex, England
 Heybridge, Maldon, Essex, England
home to Heybridge Swifts F.C. and Heybridge Basin
 Heybridge, Tasmania, Australia